Buena Familia is a Philippine television drama series broadcast by GMA Network. Directed by Gil Tejada Jr., it stars Kylie Padilla and Julie Anne San Jose. It premiered on July 28, 2015 on the network's Afternoon Prime line up replacing Yagit. The series concluded on March 4, 2016 with a total of 159 episodes. It was replaced by Hanggang Makita Kang Muli in its timeslot.

The series is streaming online on YouTube.

Premise
The Buena family is wealthy and respected by society. When Arthur Buena's mistress comes back for revenge to Arthur and his family, she will succeed and change the lives of the Buena family. The Buena siblings will be separated, and Celine being the eldest will find a way to make them whole again.

Cast and characters

Lead cast
 Kylie Padilla as Celine Buena / Rochel C. Buena 
 Julie Anne San Jose as Darlina "Darling" A. Buena

Supporting cast
 Julian Trono as Edwin A. Buena
 Mona Louise Rey as Faye A. Buena
 Angelu de Leon as Bettina Agravante-Buena / Sally Rosales
 Bobby Andrews as Arthur Buena
 Sheryl Cruz as Josephine Carter
 Jake Vargas as Kevin Acosta Vergara
 Martin del Rosario as Harry Atendido
 Jackie Rice as Iris Florencio
 Ryza Cenon as Vaness Castro
 Aicelle Santos as Olga Vergara
 Mayton Eugenio as Lauren Villacor
 Mel Kimura as Gloria Racaza
 Lou Sison as Alexis Manuel
 Tessie Tomas as Marissa Agravante

Guest cast
 Pinky Amador as Sandra Atendido
 Gerald Madrid as Marlon Abad
 Dino Guevarra as Quentin Monsanto
 Tess Bomb as Norma Sebastian
 Arianne Bautista as Pamela
 Gigi Locsin as Tonya
 Diego Llorico as Enrico Perez / Birty
 Kenneth Medrano as Pacoy Alvero
 Via Antonio as Marga Varga
 Vince Velasco as Tony Lopez
 Dan Alvaro as Kenneth Vasquez
 Marky Lopez as Utoy Velasco
 Kristofer Martin as Zach Michaels

Ratings
According to AGB Nielsen Philippines' Mega Manila household television ratings, the pilot episode of Buena Familia earned a 14.6% rating. While the final episode scored a 15.5% rating.

References

External links
 
 

2015 Philippine television series debuts
2016 Philippine television series endings
Filipino-language television shows
GMA Network drama series
Television shows set in the Philippines